Gap junction gamma-3, also known as connexin-29 (Cx29) or gap junction epsilon-1 (GJE1), is a protein that in humans is encoded by the GJC3 gene.

GJC3 is a conexin.

Function 

This gene encodes a gap junction protein. The encoded protein is known as a connexin, most of which form gap junctions that provide direct connections between neighboring cells. However, Cx29, which is highly expressed in myelin-forming glial cells of the CNS and PNS, has not been documented to form gap junctions in any cell type. In both PNS and CNS myelinated axons, Cx29 is precisely colocalized with Kv1.2 voltage-gated K+ channels, where both proteins are concentrated in the juxtaparanode and along the inner mesaxon. By freeze-fracture immunogold labeling electron microscopy, Cx29 is identified in abundant "rosettes" of transmembrane protein particles in the innermost layer of myelin, directly apposed to equally abundant immunogold-labeled Kv1.1 potassium channels, both in the juxtaparanodal axolemma and along the inner mesaxon. A role in K+ handling during saltatory conduction is implied but not yet demonstrated.

Clinical significance 

Mutations in this gene have been reported to be associated with nonsyndromic hearing loss.

References

Further reading 

 
 
 
 
 
 
 
 

Connexins